Dave Murman (born June 30, 1953) is an American politician serving as a member of the Nebraska Legislature from the 38th district. Elected in November 2018, he assumed office on January 9, 2019.

Early life and education 
Murman was born in Hastings, Nebraska, and raised on his family's farm. After graduating from Sandy Creek High School, he earned a Bachelor of Science degree in animal science from the University of Nebraska–Lincoln in 1976.

Career 
Murman worked as an EMT for Glenvil Fire and Rescue. He was also the president of the Nebraska State Dairy Association. He was elected to the Nebraska Legislature in November 2018 and assumed office on January 9, 2019.

Electoral history

References 

1953 births
Living people
Republican Party Nebraska state senators
People from Hastings, Nebraska
University of Nebraska–Lincoln alumni